The 1995 E3 Harelbeke was the 38th edition of the E3 Harelbeke cycle race and was held on 25 March 1995. The race started and finished in Harelbeke. The race was won by Bart Leysen of the Mapei team.

General classification

References

1995 in Belgian sport
1995